Amboli Vidhan Sabha constituency was one of the seats in Maharashtra Legislative Assembly in India. Amboli is a suburb of Mumbai.

Members of Vidhan Sabha

Election Results

1978 Assembly Election
 Ramesh Sheth (JNP) : 38,349 votes    
 Indulkar Pratap Mahadeo INC(I) : 17,965

1980 Assembly Election
 Hafiz Yusuf (INC-Indira) : 26,572 votes    
 Ramesh Sheth (BJP) : 15,266

2004 Assembly Election
 Baldev Basantsingh Khosa (INC) : 82,153 votes  
 Jaywant Mahadeo Parab (SHS) : 72206

See also 
 List of constituencies of Maharashtra Legislative Assembly

References 

Former assembly constituencies of Maharashtra